Shanxi Agricultural University (山西农业大学) is a university in Shanxi, China under the authority of the provincial government.

It is in the city of Taigu (太谷), a rural area with a population of about 40,000 people.

History
The school was founded in 1907 as the Ming Hsien school by a group of missionaries from Oberlin College, including the financier H.H. Kung, the future husband of Soong Ai-ling, the eldest of the three Song (Soong) sisters.

More precisely, the Oberlin missionaries founded a primary school in Taigu in the 1880s. When he was a boy, H.H. Kung became friends with the missionaries after they cured him of an eye disease. The missionaries were killed in the Boxer Rebellion during the summer of 1900, but Kung was sheltered by his family and survived. A few years later, now a young man, Kung was invited to continue his studies at Oberlin College. After graduating from Oberlin, he obtained his master's degree at Yale and then returned to China.

In 1907 Kung founded Ming Hsien high school in his hometown of Taigu. ("Ming Hsien" means "remember the worthy" and was named in honor of his Oberlin missionary friends.) Beginning in 1908, Oberlin began sending recent graduates to teach at Ming Hsien and support Kung's efforts under the auspices of the Oberlin-Shansi Memorial Association.

In 1950, following the Communist victory in the civil war, Ming Hsien was taken over by the party, turned into a university, and renamed "Shansi Agricultural University." The American teachers from Oberlin were expelled and did not return until 1982, following China's "reform and opening."

Academics
Primarily an agricultural university (one of the few remaining Chinese agricultural universities in a farming area), the school also has departments in the arts, physical education and English language study. The university maintains connections with Oberlin Shansi Memorial Association, a non-profit organization operating out of Oberlin College, engaging in cross-cultural and education exchange programs. Each year, the university hosts young English teachers who have recently graduated from Oberlin College.

In addition to the Oberlin Shansi program, Shanxi Agricultural University has established academic relations with universities and research institutions in Germany, Japan, Australia and Britain. The university has received worldwide recognition and has very good collaboration with more than 20 universities, colleges and institutes.

The Shanxi Agricultural University is one of the top universities in Shanxi Province. Its agriculture and biology school have very good reputation with a State Key Lab. The Shanxi Agricultural University has 17 schools and departments, 1 State Key lab, 5 Province Key labs, 6 State Research Centers. The number of faculty and staff is around 1,600; the number of graduate and undergraduate student is around 20,000.

The Agriculture College of Shanxi Agricultural University has more than 130 faculty and administrative staff, including, 27 full professors, 41 associate professors. There are two Distinguished Plant Protection and Crop Cultivation and Geoponics Research Centers sponsored by the National Natural Science Foundation of China and by the Shanxi Province Natural Science Foundation. Authorized by the Chinese Ministry of Education, the College of Agriculture confers BS, MS and PhD degree for related fields in Agronomy, Plant Protection, Agronomy Education, Biotechnology, Bioinformatics, Animal and Plant Quarantine, Pharmaceutical Engineering, and Seed Science and Engineering.

Since 1943, more than 8,000 students have been conferred BS degree, 900 students have been conferred MS and PhD degree. Their graduates at all levels have distinguished themselves in academic, industrial, and governmental careers.

External links
Shanxi Agricultural University

Universities and colleges in Shanxi
Agricultural universities and colleges in China